Michelle Asha Albert is an American physician who is the Walter A. Haas Lucie-Stern Endowed Chair in Cardiology and professor of medicine at the University of California, San Francisco. Albert is director of the UCSF Center for the Study of Adversity and Cardiovascular Disease (NURTURE Center). She is president of the American Heart Association. She served as the president of the Association of Black Cardiologists in 2020–2022 and as president of the Association of University Cardiologists (2021–2022). Albert is an elected member of the National Academy of Medicine and the American Society of Clinical Investigators.

Early life and education 
Albert spent her early childhood in Guyana. She grew up with her grandparents. Whilst Albert initially planned to become an actuary, her career plans changed after her grandfather suddenly died. Her studies of slavery, her experiences in a developing country and losing her grandfather inspired her to become a physician. At the age of fifteen, her family moved to Brooklyn. Albert attended Haverford College, where she studied chemistry and graduated at the age of twenty. She attended medical school at the University of Rochester. Albert moved to the Harvard T.H. Chan School of Public Health, where she earned a Master of Public Health. Albert was a cardiology fellow at Brigham and Women's Hospital.

Research and career 
After completing her medical residency and chief residency at Columbia University in New York, Albert completed cardiovascular medicine fellowship at Harvard Medical School and Brigham and Women's Hospital.  Thereafter, she was appointed to the faculty at the Harvard Medical School. She was eventually appointed Associate Professor of Medicine. Albert subsequently served as the Vivian Beaumont Allen Endowed Professor at Howard University. She joined the faculty at the University of California, San Francisco in 2015.

Albert's research considers adversity, health disparities and cardiology. She is a cardiologist and Director of the Center for the Study of Adversity and Cardiovascular Disease at the University of California at San Francisco School of Medicine where she also serves as Admissions Dean. In particular, she is interested in the social determinants of health, and how an understanding of these can transform the healthcare of global populations. She makes use of inflammatory and thrombotic biomarkers of cardiovascular disease risks, and assesses how these biomarkers vary by demographic or social characteristics. Based on this research, Albert created strategies to limit the risk of cardiovascular disease amongst people from historically marginalized groups.

During the COVID-19 pandemic, Albert studied the impact of COVID-19 on heart health, particularly the heart health of Black women. In the United States, the stress that Black people experience due to everyday discrimination contributes to worse cardiovascular health.

Awards and honours 
 2004 Association of Black Cardiologists Herbert W. Nickens Epidemiology Award
 2010 Brigham and Women's Hospital Nesson Fellowship Award
 2012 American College of Cardiology  Heart of Women's Health CREDO Award
 2014 Women's Day Magazine Red Dress Award Honoree
 2015 Haverford College Haverford Award
 2016 American Heart Association Women in Cardiology Mentoring Award
 2016    Elected Member of the Association of University Cardiologists
 2018 Association of Black Cardiologists Daniel D. Savage Science Award
 2018    American Heart Association Merit Award
 2019 Elected member of the American Society for Clinical Investigation 
 2020 American Heart Association Population Science Research Award
 2020 American Heart Association COVID-19 Rapid Track Science Award

Selected publications

References 

UCSF School of Medicine faculty
Living people
Year of birth missing (living people)
American people of Guyanese descent
Guyanese scientists
Haverford College alumni
University of Rochester alumni
Harvard School of Public Health alumni
Howard University faculty
21st-century American women physicians
21st-century American physicians
Members of the National Academy of Medicine
Presidents of the American Heart Association
American cardiologists
Women cardiologists
African-American women physicians